Elenora "Rukiya" Brown is an artist from New Orleans who has appeared in several art shows and exhibits around the country. In 2008 she was featured in the African American Fine Arts Show. Her style of crafting dolls is unique and contributes to education in art of the African diaspora.

Introduction to Rukiya
Rukiya is a doll artist who grew up across the street from Chicago's Garfield Park in the 1960s. Although she moved to New Orleans with her family as a teenager, Rukiya returned to Chicago as one of the hundreds of thousands of displaced victims of Hurricane Katrina. Influenced by her many trials in life, Rukiya has been inspired to create dolls that represent healing and strength among women in the African diaspora. Her work illustrates deep connections to the roots she feels in her African identity and the significance of her dolls, according to artist and curator Gale Fulton Ross, is proof "that millions of our ancestors live deep within her center" Rukiya uses traditional craft and embellishments on her dolls that root her work in the history of Africans and the African diaspora. Although she now has a gallery in New Orleans, Rukiya has an established tradition of unveiling her new creations in Chicago, her way of thanking the city for its support after Katrina. Like many African Americans from New Orleans, Rukiya has suffered through the trials and tribulations of life post-Katrina, and hopes to use her art to reflect the healing process in both her life and in the lives of individuals of the black diaspora around the world. The dolls of her "Winds of Change", "Uprooted" and "Unclaimed Memories" collections, while being rooted in tradition, reflect this contemporary issue as it relates to victims of Hurricane Katrina, many of whom fled to and resettled in Chicago.

Hurricane Katrina and the African Diaspora
Hurricane Katrina marked a major event in American as well as African American history. Katrina made landfall on August 29, 2005, forcing more than 800,000 people to evacuate the Gulf Coast. It was the largest displacement of people in US history and the situation quickly took on a national scope as 45 states provided disaster relief services. According to a study specifically on Chicago's emergency response, within a week "nearly 500 evacuees had been airlifted to Illinois, and over the following two weeks more than 6000 displaced individuals were estimated to have arrived on their own, most settling in the Chicago area. This was more than any other non-southern city.

Hurricane Katrina and the storm's aftermath greatly affected the black community in two ways. First was the sheer number of African American individuals who were displaced by the storm. Sixty percent of New Orleans' population was African American before the storm. Almost half of the deaths blamed on the storm were African American. Previously, it has been written that the rich history and jazz and carnival traditions in some ways made New Orleans the most "African city in America". Secondly, issues of race within America emerged in the aftermath of Hurricane Katrina. Darwin BondGraham wrote that Hurricane Katrina brought to the surface many structural and socio-economic transformations within the region that historically confined poor blacks to older parts of cities while transferring employment and resources to the suburbs. Hurricane Katrina called attention to these situations when many in poor neighborhoods could not evacuate properly and relief response was slow. Many African American leaders called for race and minority considerations in reconstruction plans for the region to ensure an inclusive and proactive agenda.

About Rukiya
Born Elenora Brown, Rukiya spent much of her free time as a child across the street from her home in Garfield Park in Chicago gathering "materials" for her creations. As a young girl Rukiya had a passion for dolls and doll making and would often make them for friends and family. Her family was poor and her mom worked two jobs to be able to support her eight children, fathered by four different men. Growing up, Rukiya recalls that store bought dolls, which she only occasionally received at Christmas time, were all white. Thus, she would often make her own using materials from the park across the street as well as corn husks and her mother's stalkings.

After her family moved to New Orleans in 1969, when she was 15, she started dating a man and eventually became pregnant. Although she discovered he had fathered another woman's child around the same time, she married him anyway and they moved to England together after he joined the air force in 1979. While in London she studied textiles and design before leaving her husband and returning to New Orleans in 1994. Rukiya explains that her time in New Orleans and Louisiana greatly influenced her own journey as she discovered her African roots and her descent from both the Ibo people of Nigeria and the Ewondo people of Cameroon. This knowledge would greatly influence Rukiya's work, which "celebrates old tradition by making new and relevant art".

Once back in New Orleans, Rukiya began making dolls. In 2002, she was discovered by a gallery owner at the New Orleans Jazz Festival. Three years later she was driven from her home by hurricane Katrina and returned to Chicago for a time. She now premieres all of her collections in Chicago to pay tribute to the city's hospitality towards her and the other displaced Katrina victims who arrived in the city in 2005 and 2006. Today Rukiya is almost 60 years old and can often be seen wearing billowy shifts from Africa and chunky beads, looking as one article commented, "more African than the Africans". She lives in a faded pink clapboard house in New Orleans that is filled with her creations. She has won numerous awards and appeared in shows across the country. Rukiya has used her experiences and artwork to connect to other women, including Rwandan genocide survivors and rape victims.

Rukiya and Her Dolls
Rukiya's work seeks to fuse historical influences and African cultural traditions with contemporary issues. She recognizes the disruption of African artistic tradition that took place when slaves were brought to the America's and the prohibitive hardships that prevented slaves from passing along their native crafts to future generations. While some say those practices are lost to blacks in America forever, Rukiya attempts to revive a certain art tradition that incorporates African influences and to fight the hardships that "reduced the typical Black hand to a gnarled stump."

Rukiya has written on her gallery website that sculptures, called ancestor figures, are often created in Africa to represent deceased loved ones. In this way she believes her dolls "have a great spiritual, healing importance rather than being just a play toy". She often adorns her dolls with hand-wrapped symbols, moss, cotton, bead, mirrors and cowrie shells (symbolizing affluence, wealth, and spirituality), using products from the Earth. She uses these materials to "declare that Mother Africa's traditions are not dead. They still rise." She attempts to stay true to traditional art forms as an attempt to keep African culture alive in the black community of America.

Rukiya calls her art a type of therapy, hoping that it brings healing to herself and others. By using materials of the past and generically black facial features or no face at all, it becomes possible for one to identify themselves in the spirit of the dolls. For example, Rukiya's "Unforgivable Blackness" is a  representation of a young, dark woman with typical African features of big lips, high cheekbones, and wild explosions of hair. The figure wears a lace dress resembling a wedding dress and the figure's head is tilted back with eyes closed, suggesting an uneasy vulnerability. This doll may have been a reflection of Rukiya's own difficult experiences with marriage. However, the piece also suggests a wider application relating to the struggles often experienced by African American women as they navigate marriage and family while often living in poverty. Indeed, Rukiya's work is an attempt to reach others coping with similar pains as herself and a representation of "the effort of an individual to save herself, instead of waiting around for someone else's help".

Katrina Dolls
In 2008 Rukiya debuted a collection of dolls at the African American Fine Arts Show in Chicago. The dolls were part of her 2008 collection "Swimming to the Top of the Rain", and mirrored "the progress that she and New Orleans have made" since Hurricane Katrina. The premiere of her collection is part of a tradition Rukiya has established of revealing her work in Chicago. After being displaced by Katrina in 2005, Rukiya spent time in Chicago. She states that "Chicago always gets the first look, because they were so good to me". This was the latest in a series of collections commemorating the events surrounding Hurricane Katrina, connecting events of New Orleans with Chicago using traditional African inspiration and reflecting a common identity in the African diaspora. The dolls represent something that cannot be torn away by a storm.

“Winds of Change", 2005 is the first of Rukiya's dolls created in reference to Hurricane Katrina. The moss hair, use of cowery shells, and exaggerated features are consistent with Rukiya's attempts to use elements of earth and be consistent with African art forms. The torn, stained gauze dress and crazy hair give a certain disheveled paler to the piece, reflective of the shock and uncertainty that often comes with change. The beaded arms hang loose, perhaps with a sense of defeat and helplessness. Of this work, Rukiya wrote, "My world changed on August 29, 2005. I was thinking it would never happen to New Orleans instead of strangers. On TV I saw people and places I knew. At first it felt like a story, a movie not real. I cried out my people my people my people. The pain that life brings.”

The "Uprooted" collection (2006) contained 100 dolls, carrying the message "Look up, hold on". One of the signature dolls of the collection finds the doll positioned on an uprooted tree branch. Katrina uprooted many old, mighty trees, but the storm also uprooted people's lives. Rukiya explains that she created this collection with that in mind and wants to make sure people don't forget the hardship experienced when it took the government over a week to bring help. She goes on to say that some who were uprooted saw a better change and planted new roots elsewhere while others chose to return to New Orleans and rebuild their lives even stronger. Her work in the collection highlights the controversy surrounding the slow government response, which many saw as a sign of institutionalized racism.

Rukiya sees her works as having a spiritual and healing component. Perhaps this is what inspired her 2007 collection "Unclaimed Memories" in which she pays homage to residents whose bodies still remained in the Morgue in New Orleans. Immortalizing those victims through their representation in the dolls provides a way for unclaimed and unidentified victims to move forward into the next life. Over 1,000 people died as a result of Hurricane Katrina and the unclaimed victims will be permanently interred in specially created mausoleums in order to give them a "rightful burial". Dolls from the collection themselves are adorned with shells, symbolizing spirituality, and photographs, which immortalized individuals who have died. The figures head is tilted up, towards heaven perhaps, and the eyes are close as in death.

References

External links
Rukiya Gallery

Artists from Louisiana
Living people
Year of birth missing (living people)